Pathiravum Pakalvelichavum is a 1974 Indian Malayalam-language film, directed by M. Azad and produced by Thayyil Kunjikandan. The film stars Prem Nazir, Jayabharathi, Sankaradi and Sreelatha Namboothiri. The film had musical score by K. Raghavan.

Cast

Prem Nazir
Jayabharathi
Sankaradi
Sreelatha Namboothiri
Raghavan
Bahadoor
Balan K. Nair
Nilambur Ayisha
S. P. Pillai
T. Damodaran
Aruna

Soundtrack
The music was composed by K. Raghavan with lyrics by Yusufali Kechery.

References

External links
 

1974 films
1970s Malayalam-language films